Southern Comfort is a 1981 American action thriller film directed by Walter Hill and written by Michael Kane, Hill and his longtime collaborator David Giler. It stars Keith Carradine, Powers Boothe, Fred Ward, T. K. Carter, Franklyn Seales and Peter Coyote. The film, set in 1973, features a Louisiana Army National Guard squad of nine from an infantry unit on weekend maneuvers in rural bayou country as they antagonize some local Cajun people and become hunted.

Plot
In 1973, a squad of nine Louisiana Army National Guard soldiers convene in a local bayou for weekend maneuvers. New to the squad is Corporal Hardin, a cynical transfer from the Texas Army National Guard. He soon becomes disgusted with the arrogant behavior and attitudes of the men. A happily-married chemical engineer in his civilian life, Hardin wants no part of a date with prostitutes which PFC Spencer has arranged for himself and their squad-mates. Nevertheless, he hits it off with the amiable Spencer, and both find themselves to be the most level-headed soldiers in their squad.

The nine soldiers set out on patrol and soon get disoriented in the remote swampland. They come across a seemingly-abandoned campsite with several canoe-type boats called pirogues. To continue onward, the Guardsmen need the pirogues to get across the flooded swamp. The squad's leader, Staff Sergeant Poole, a Vietnam War veteran, tells one of his men to leave a note explaining the situation, and orders the soldiers into three of the four pirogues. As they set out across the bayou, a group of Cajun hunter-trappers return and yell at the soldiers for having taken their boats. In response, PFC Stuckey fires blanks from his M-60 machine gun at the Cajuns, thinking it amusing when the Cajuns take cover. The Cajuns return fire with live ammunition, killing Poole and sending the squad into a panic as they make their way toward cover.

Sgt. Casper – the strict, inexperienced, and unpopular second-in-command – orders the squad to continue their "mission." They discover that Cpl. Reece has brought along a box of live ammunition for hunting purposes. Reece is forced at knife-point by Hardin to give up the live ammo, and Casper divides it evenly among the soldiers, in order to bolster their chances of defense. They reach the shack of a one-armed Cajun hunter-trapper, who speaks only French. Casper has him arrested as a prisoner of war. The emotionally unstable Cpl. Bowden uses gasoline to ignite some TNT inside the shack, blowing it up, along with numerous provisions of food, fresh water, guns, and ammunition.

The soldiers feel increasingly threatened. Hearing the barking of dogs, the Guardsmen presume they're about to be rescued. The dogs, however, belong to the Cajuns, who are now stalking the soldiers because of Stuckey's actions. The Guardsmen fend off the attacking dogs, only to find that lethal boobytraps have been set for them. Pvt. Cribbs is killed when he trips a spear-bed built into a spring-released cradle-frame, impaling him. The squad camps for the night. Overnight, Bowden begins to have a serious mental breakdown, refusing to speak to anyone or move. The group decides to tie him up for the night. The following morning, Reece tortures the one-armed Cajun by dunking his head in a fetid pond. Hardin discovers this and tries to stop it. Both soldiers get in a fight to the death with bayonets. As the men fight, Hardin gains the upper hand, and to his surprise, the one-armed Cajun screams in English for Hardin to kill Reece. After Reece is killed, the one-armed Cajun escapes into the swamp. Stuckey, who was close friends with Reece, threatens to kill Hardin.

As a helicopter passes overhead, the soldiers frantically try to signal it. Rushing headlong into the swamp after the chopper as it moves onward, Stuckey sinks to his death in quicksand. Having no confidence in Casper after his inept leadership, Spencer relieves him of command. They split up to search for Stuckey. Casper throws a homemade grenade at the Cajuns to no avail, then fixes his bayonet to his rifle and charges at them. Both he and PFC. Simms are shot dead.

Spencer, Hardin, and the now-catatonic Bowden camp for the night. The following morning Hardin and Spencer are jolted awake by a freight train, and then realize that Bowden is missing. They move to the train tracks and find Bowden hanging dead from a bridge. The one-armed Cajun appears on the tracks overhead. In perfect English, he warns Spencer and Hardin to leave the Cajuns' territory while they still can. He gives them directions on how to escape the bayou, since Hardin and Spencer saved him from physical assault by Simms and Reece.

Following the one-armed Cajun's advice, Spencer and Hardin follow a dirt road and end up hitching a ride with a friendly Cajun couple. They are driven to a pig roast at a nearby Cajun village. As Spencer happily mixes with the villagers, a wary Hardin sees the arrival of the three remaining hunter-trappers who massacred their squad. One of Hardin's would-be-killers chases him into a shed and wounds him in the arm. Spencer suddenly shows up, firing blanks at the Cajun as a distraction, giving Hardin the chance to stab him in the groin. The other two Cajuns arrive, and Spencer runs, leading them away from the injured Hardin. Spencer, hiding around a corner, hits one of the Cajuns in the face with the butt of his M-16, knocking him out. The remaining Cajun gives chase, but as he is about to shoot Spencer, Hardin grabs him from behind. This gives Spencer the opportunity to stab him to death with his bayonet. Leaving behind the village, Spencer and Hardin slip away unseen into the swamp. As the duo moves into the swamp, another helicopter arrives overhead and seems to stay in the vicinity. They get back to the dirt road just in time to see a U.S. Army truck drive towards them. They look at each other, knowing they are finally safe.

Cast

Production

Development
Hill first wrote the script in 1976. At one stage it was known as The Prey.

According to Walter Hill he and David Giler had a deal with 20th Century Fox to "acquire and develop interesting, commercial scripts that could be produced cheaply. Alien (1979) was one of them, and Southern Comfort was another. We wanted to do a survival story, and I'd already done a film in Louisiana."

They hired a writer, Michael Kane, to do a draft which Giler and Hill then rewrote. According to Hill, "No studio wanted to make it, but an independent guy showed up who had a relationship with Fox. Liked it, said he would finance it."

The film was financed by the Cinema Group. This was a company headed by William J. Immerman, whose head of production was Venetia Stevenson, daughter of director Robert Stevenson. The Cinema Group had raised a fund of $30 million to make movies, half of which was private, the other half which was publicly raised. Southern Comfort was their second film. (Take This Job and Shove It was their first.)

Powers Boothe was cast after Hill and Giler saw him play Jim Jones in the mini series Guyana Tragedy.

Hill said the concept of Keith Carradine's character "was that he was one of nature's aristocrats – graceful, confident of his own ability and able to separate himself from other people with an amusing remark", whereas the character played by Boothe "is much more the rational, hardworking, self made individual" and as a result "just cannot believe the nature of the situation at first" whereas Carradine's can.

Shooting
The movie was shot in Louisiana over 55 days in the Caddo Lake area outside Shreveport. Hill:
We were very aware that people were going to see it as a metaphor for Vietnam. The day we had the cast read, before we went into the swamps, I told everybody, 'People are going to say this is about Vietnam. They can say whatever they want, but I don't want to hear another word about it.'"
The film is supported by an atmospheric soundtrack by longstanding Hill collaborator Ry Cooder. The song "Parlez Nous à Boire", sung during the scene in the Cajun village at the end of the film, was performed by Cajun musician Dewey Balfa. The film includes many actors, including Fred Ward and Peter Coyote, who had one of their first big roles here.

Hill later said he enjoyed the experience of making the film but that it was tough:
I was very proud of the actors in it. It was a tough movie to make, and they put up with a lot. They would probably tell you they put up with a lot from me. [Laughs.] But they really did it without complaint. And I just thought I was very fortunate to have the cast that I had. Jesus, it was a hard movie to make... I think when you see the movie you can see that this one wasn't nightclubs in Vegas. But it was just very hard locations to get in there. Very hard to shoot. I remember so many times we'd only have a few minutes to set the camera because the bottom of the swamp would give way. And so, for your camera positions, you had to stage and shoot very quickly in many cases. It just was hard, and the weather was miserable. However, I will say this: If you choose to go make a movie in a swamp in the middle of winter, you probably deserve what you get. [Laughs.]
"It was unbelievably tough", said Powers Boothe. "The actors would clamber out of the muck just in time to get back into it. The situation was even harder on the crew. They'd set up a camera platform and it would slowly sink into the bayou. Or with a tripod, one leg would sink. And how can actors hit their marks in two feet of water?... I have to give Walter Hill credit for making the three months as endurable as possible. We didn't lose our senses of humor until late in the shooting. Taking two weeks off at Christmas time helped keep our sanity."

Walter Hill said the film was "not a simple action movie where the people chasing the other out there is bad":
It is clearly in a sense the kind of fault of our guys for getting into this situation. In the collective group, there are individuals who are not as highly evolved as the others. And the answers to the dilemma, I mean both nature's noblemen, those of higher character through some innate quality. And you have people that operate on a sliding scale downward to the brute level in their response to the situation that they have gotten themselves into. All of which I think is a kind of, war is terrible. It's a wartime situation. With mixed results and accompanying paranoia even by those who are the best and the brightest of the bunch... None of us are quite as good or bad as we construct them. Southern Comfort is trying not to be an easy drama.

Soundtrack
The music was done by Ry Cooder who had just worked with Hill on The Long Riders. Cooder later said:
Because my own musical fantasies and Walter Hill's film fantasies arc in sync, it's possible for me to score a film like Southern Comfort without understanding the first thing about its environment. All I had to do was think about this weird swamp, and the Cajun people that nobody knew about. I had to imagine what they were going to sound like, and I figured on the style of John Lee Hooker's music.

Reception
Walter Hill later said he was "always amazed" by the reception to the film. "The American reception was a real kind of nothing. But it was very nicely received around the world."

He added that the movie "didn't make a fucking nickel anywhere. Foreign, domestic, anything... I was proud of the film... But I was disappointed in the lack of response. It was a universal audience failure... Usually you can say they loved it in Japan or something. I don't think anybody loved it anywhere."

On the Rotten Tomatoes website the film has received a positive reception from critics with an overall rating of 76% from 21 reviews. Roger Ebert rated it 3 stars, stating that it is "a film of drum-tight professionalism" but criticizing it for making its characters "into larger-than-life stick figures, into symbolic units who stand for everything except themselves." While he said that the stock nature of the characters reminded him greatly of the way Hill approached the gang members in The Warriors (to which he gave a 2 stars, thumbs down review) he also said that he would recommend Southern Comfort partly because he had overlooked good qualities of Hill's previous film over that issue, and that the atmosphere and pacing of Southern Comfort were so strong that he gave it a thumbs up. At the time critics regularly made reference to the film's plot similarities to John Boorman's 1972 thriller Deliverance.

Change of story under Iranian censorship
In the late 1980s Iranian state TV IRIB broadcast the film, under the name "Operation Lagoon" (Amaliyate Mordab). The film was shortened to 95 minutes, and the story was changed. In the Iranian version, a group of US Army soldiers who opposed the Vietnam War are sent to a mission among man-hunters, equipped only with blanks. The soldiers are killed by man-hunters one after another as planned by US authorities. At the end, when the remaining two soldiers believe the US Army truck is coming to save them, the picture fades and a voice of constant shooting is heard, indicating the US authorities killed all the soldiers. The film was a huge hit among the Iranian audience. The Iranian film critics believed that the IRIB censored version made more sense considering the American government's alleged atrocities overseas.

See also
 List of American films of 1981
 Survival film, about the film genre, with a list of related films
 "Amos Moses", 1970 song by Jerry Reed about a one-armed Cajun poacher

References

Bibliography

External links
 
 
 
 "Walter Hill: The Hollywood Interview" (September 8, 2009)

1981 films
1981 action thriller films
1981 independent films
20th Century Fox films
American action thriller films
American independent films
1980s English-language films
Films scored by Ry Cooder
Films directed by Walter Hill
Films set in Louisiana
Films set in 1973
Films set in forests
American survival films
Southern Gothic films
Films with screenplays by Walter Hill
Films shot in Louisiana
Censored films
1980s American films